Robert Alexander Neve, OC (born May 24, 1962) is a Canadian human rights activist and the secretary general of Amnesty International Canada.

Born in Calgary, Alberta, the son of Robert Rex Neve and Jean Elizabeth Taylor, Neve received a bachelor of commerce degree in 1984 and a bachelor of laws degree in 1987 from Dalhousie University. A few years later, he went to England to study international human rights law, receiving a master of law degree from the University of Essex in 1991. He is married to Patricia Goyeche and they have three children.

Neve practiced law in Ottawa with a focus in the areas of refugee and immigration law. He has been a member of Amnesty International since the mid-1980s and has worked for the organization nationally and internationally in a number of different roles, including missions to Tanzania, Guinea, Mexico, Burundi, Chad, Colombia, Honduras, Zimbabwe, Côte d'Ivoire, South Africa, South Sudan, Bangladesh, and Ghana. In Toronto, he has been affiliated with the Centre for Refugee Studies at York University and has taught international human rights and refugee law at Osgoode Hall Law School. He has authored and contributed many reports and studies for Amnesty International as well as legal submissions to parliamentary committees and United Nations human rights bodies, including the Maher Arar Commission. He regularly lectures, participates in conferences, and speaks and writes in the national media on a range of human rights topics. Before taking on the role of secretary general in January 2000, he served as a member of the Immigration and Refugee Board of Canada. Within Canada, Neve has also been involved with the issue of Alberta's Lubicon Cree.

Awards
On December 28, 2007, Neve was appointed an Officer of the Order of Canada, in honour of his human rights work.

In May 2009 he was awarded an Honorary Doctorate of Laws degree by the University of New Brunswick.

In June 2016 he was awarded an Honorary Doctor of Laws by the University of Waterloo.

References

External links
 Amnesty film on Lubicon Cree of Alberta

1962 births
Living people
Alumni of the University of Essex
Canadian human rights activists
Dalhousie University alumni
Immigration and Refugee Board of Canada
Lawyers in Ontario
Officers of the Order of Canada
People from Calgary
Academic staff of York University